Atractus caxiuana is a species of snake in the family Colubridae. The species can be found in Brazil and Colombia. Juveniles have yellow blotches on their nasal region as well as behind their eyes, with a brown body and darker vertebral line one scale wide.

References 

Atractus
Reptiles of Brazil
Reptiles of Colombia
Snakes of South America
Reptiles described in 2006